Bonto Tangnga is a village in Uluere district, Bantaeng Regency in South Sulawesi province. Its population is 1055.

Climate
Bonto Tangnga has a tropical monsoon climate (Am) with little rainfall from August to October and heavy to very heavy rainfall in the remaining months.

References

Villages in South Sulawesi